Štrkovec is a village and municipality in the Rimavská Sobota District of the Banská Bystrica Region of southern Slovakia, near the border to Hungary. It was part of Hungary until the Treaty of Trianon of 1920. Its Hungarian name is Kövecses.

Villages and municipalities in Rimavská Sobota District